Shameless is an American comedy drama television series developed by John Wells that aired on Showtime from January 9, 2011, to April 11, 2021. It is an adaptation of Paul Abbott's British series of the same name and features an ensemble cast led by William H. Macy and Emmy Rossum. The show is set on the South Side of Chicago, Illinois.

With the premiere of the ninth season on September 9, 2018, Shameless became the longest-running original scripted series in Showtime's history. In January 2019, the series was renewed for a tenth season, which premiered on November 10, 2019. In January 2020, the series was renewed for its eleventh and final season, which was scheduled to premiere in mid-2020, but was delayed due to the COVID-19 pandemic; it instead premiered on December 6, 2020. On December 14, 2020, Showtime announced that they were airing a clip show series during Season 11, Shameless: Hall of Shame, containing new scenes juxtaposed with clips from the show to summarize the characters' journeys during the prior 10 seasons.

Premise
The series depicts the poor, dysfunctional family of Frank Gallagher, a neglectful single father of six: Fiona, Phillip, Ian, Debbie, Carl, and Liam. He spends his days drunk, high, or in search of misadventures, while his children learn to take care of themselves. The show's producers sought to distinguish this production from previous American working-class shows by highlighting how Frank's alcohol and drug addiction affect his family.

Episodes

Cast and characters

 William H. Macy as Frank Gallagher, the patriarch of the family and father to Fiona, Lip, Carl, Debbie, and Liam, and uncle to Ian, whom he raises as his son. He is an alcoholic and chronically unemployed, instead making money through various scams.
 Emmy Rossum as Fiona Gallagher, the feisty, street-smart eldest Gallagher sibling, who raises the children on her own due to Frank and Monica's neglect, and eventually becomes their legal guardian. (seasons 1–9)
 Justin Chatwin as Steve Wilton / Jimmy Lishman, an illegal stolen car salesman who is the love interest of Fiona for the first three seasons. (seasons 1–3; special guest season 4; recurring season 5) 
 Ethan Cutkosky as Carl Gallagher, the third Gallagher brother, who has a tendency for trouble making as a child, but grows up to be a policeman after witnessing a murder. 
 Shanola Hampton as Veronica "V" Fisher, Fiona’s best friend and neighbour, who lives with her husband Kevin and, later, their twin daughters. 
 Steve Howey as Kevin "Kev" Ball, Veronica’s husband and the owner of a local bar.
 Emma Kenney as Debbie Gallagher, the strong-willed youngest Gallagher daughter, who has a child at age 15. She later comes out as a lesbian. 
 Jeremy Allen White as Philip "Lip" Gallagher, the eldest Gallagher son, who is highly intelligent but struggles with addiction. He has a child with Tami in season 10 named Fred. 
 Cameron Monaghan as Ian Gallagher, the most strong-hearted, persistent, and goofy brother/cousin of the Gallaghers, who is the result of an affair between Monica and Frank’s brother. He is gay and engages in an on-and-off relationship with Mickey.
 Noel Fisher as Mickey Milkovich, a violent and erratic member of the Milkovich family, who are neighbors of the Gallaghers. He is Ian’s main love interest and eventually becomes estranged from his family due to their homophobic attitudes. (seasons 3–5, 10–11; recurring seasons 1–2, 7; special guest seasons 6 and 9) 
 Joan Cusack as Sheila Jackson, mother to Karen and love interest to Frank for the first 5 seasons. She is a sex addict and suffers from agoraphobia. (seasons 1–5) 
 Laura Slade Wiggins as Karen Jackson, Sheila’s rebellious daughter and an early love interest for Lip. (seasons 1–2; recurring season 3)
 Zach McGowan as Jody Silverman, Karen's husband and adoptive father to her son, who later becomes a love interest to Sheila. (season 3; recurring season 2)
 Emma Greenwell as Mandy Milkovich, the sister of Mickey and love interest of Lip, who eventually leaves to escape her physically abusive husband. (seasons 3–4; recurring season 2; special guest seasons 5–6) (Jane Levy played Mandy for six episodes of season 1)
 Jake McDorman as Mike Pratt, Fiona’s boss and love interest. (season 4; recurring season 3)
 Emily Bergl as Sammi Slott, the unstable and manipulative elder half-sister of the Gallaghers, who is revealed in season 4 to be a product of a teen romance of Frank's. (season 5; recurring season 4)
 Isidora Goreshter as Svetlana Yevgenivna, a Russian émigré who is Mickey's wife and the mother of his child. She later divorces him and engages in a throuple with Kevin and Veronica while working at their bar. (seasons 7–8; guest season 3; recurring seasons 4–6)
 Richard Flood as Ford Kellogg, an Irish carpenter and love interest to Fiona. (season 9; recurring season 8)
 Christian Isaiah as Liam Gallagher, the youngest Gallagher child, whose parentage is ambiguous due to his mixed-race heritage. (seasons 9–11; recurring season 8)
 Kate Miner as Tami Tamietti, Lip’s love interest and later mother to his child. (seasons 10–11; recurring season 9)

Production

Development
Shameless was adapted from a long-running, award-winning British television comedy drama of the same name. HBO began developing an American version of Shameless after striking a deal with John Wells in January 2010. By April 2010, development had moved to Showtime. John Wells Productions taped a pilot episode for the cable network in December 2010. The show's creator Paul Abbott said, "It's not My Name Is Earl or Roseanne. It's got a much graver level of poverty attached to it. It's not blue collar, it's no collar." Showrunner John Wells fought efforts to place the show in the South or in a trailer park. "We have a comedic tradition of making fun of the people in those worlds," he said. "The reality is that these people aren't 'the other'—they're people who live four blocks down from you and two blocks over."

William H. Macy stars in the lead role as Frank Gallagher, joined by Emmy Rossum as Fiona and Justin Chatwin as Steve, former co-stars from Dragonball Evolution. Paul Abbott, whose semi-autobiographical telescript was the basis for the UK pilot, is credited as an executive producer on the U.S. version.

In April 2010, Showtime green-lit the series with a 12-episode order.

The Sheila Jackson character (a romantic interest for Frank), was first portrayed by Allison Janney in a pilot; however, in late August 2010, the role was recast and Joan Cusack ended up playing Sheila for the aired episodes. Production began in mid-September.

A preview of the pilot aired on December 12, 2010, after the Season 5 finale of Dexter. The first season officially began airing on Showtime on Sunday, January 9, 2011.

The series is set in Chicago's Back of the Yards neighborhood on the South Side. The house that the Gallaghers call home is an actual house in an actual Chicago neighborhood. It's undeniably authentic, and, as fans tend to do, viewers set about trying to see if they could track down the "Shameless house," in real life.  
 
Most episodes begin with one of the main characters breaking the fourth wall to berate the viewer about missing previous episodes. Then the show cuts to a recap montage of plot points relevant to the current episode, followed by the opening title sequence.

Filming
The series is mostly filmed at a Los Angeles studio, with some scenes filmed in Chicago. Initial shooting of the second season began on July 5, 2011 and premiered January 8, 2012. The series was renewed for a third season on February 1, 2012, and initial shooting began June 27, 2012. The third season premiered on January 13, 2013, and two weeks later on January 29, Shameless was renewed for a fourth season. It premiered January 12, 2014. On February 18, 2014, the series was renewed for a fifth season. Production on the first episode of the fifth season began on July 3, 2014 with the first episode table read, with initial shooting for the season beginning on July 8, 2014. The series was renewed for a sixth season on January 12, 2015. Shameless was renewed for a 12-episode seventh season on January 12, 2016. Season 7 premiered on October 2, 2016.

In December 2016 it was reported that Emmy Rossum, after multiple seasons of being paid significantly less than her co-star William H. Macy, requested that she be paid equally and compensated in future seasons to make up for the previous salary discrepancies. The equal pay negotiations, which were vocally supported by her co-star Macy, briefly delayed work on an eighth season of the series while she and Warner Bros. Television negotiated. The dispute came to an end on December 14, when Rossum confirmed through Twitter that she would continue to work on the series, with production of an eighth season to begin in May 2017. On December 19, 2016, Showtime officially announced that Shameless had been renewed for an eighth season. Just days after the eighth season premiere, it was announced that the show had been renewed for a ninth, which would bring the show past the 100-episode mark.

In August 2018, Rossum announced her departure from Shameless after nine seasons playing Fiona Gallagher. In October 2018, Cameron Monaghan also announced his departure from the series after playing Ian Gallagher for nine seasons; however, it was later announced Monaghan was expected to return for the tenth season.

On January 13, 2020, it was announced that the series had been renewed for its eleventh and final season, which had been scheduled to air in summer 2020 but was then delayed because of the COVID-19 pandemic, and that Macy, White, Cutkosky, Hampton, Howey, Kenney, Monaghan, Fisher, Miner, and Isaiah would all return for the series' final season. Production on the final season commenced on September 8, 2020. Production for the final season ended on March 12, 2021.

Music
The theme song for Shameless is "The Luck You Got" by indie rock group The High Strung. The majority of the music featured in the series is from indie rock bands. The pilot episode used music from artists such as Cream, Spoon, Say Hi, 3OH!3, The Vines, The Moog, and LMFAO. The show has also featured music from Let's Wrestle, Eels, The Blue Van, Cake, Jimmy Eat World, Alien Crime Syndicate, Capital Cities, Future Islands, and Johnny Foreigner.

In promotion for the second-season premiere, the entire cast sang their own version of a Christmas carol, entitled "Shameless: Christmas Carol".

Broadcast
Shameless premiered on January 9, 2011 in the United States, becoming Showtime's highest-rated series debut on record across the network's target demographic. The first episode of the series generated 982,000 unique viewers, and was Showtime's largest audience for a series premiere since Dead Like Me in 2003.

The fourth episode, "Casey Casden", airing January 30, posted 1.45 million total viewers. Shameless was the cable channel's best-performing first-year drama. Defying the usual downward trend following a premiere, the series built on its initial audience, becoming number one in its time slot among adults aged 18 through 49. Subsequent episodes' audiences fluctuated between a million and 1.14 million viewers. The March 27, 2011 season finale, "Father Frank, Full of Grace," drew an audience of 1.157 million.

The third season's premiere episode, "El Gran Cañon" (airing January 13, 2013), drew 2 million viewers, becoming the show's highest rated episode to date. It then maintained average ratings of just below a million viewers throughout the remainder of its episodes.

Reception

Critical reception
Tim Goodman of The Hollywood Reporter said that "Shameless is excellent, compelling television from the first moment. As long as it stays true to the roots of the original, it's going to be essential viewing". The show's first season score on Metacritic is a 66 of 100, which is a generally favorable review. The second season score on Metacritic is a 76 of 100, indicating increasingly favorable reviews. Tom O'Neill of the Los Angeles Times reported on the Emmy buzz about Shameless, especially with respect to the performance of Emmy Rossum. He said "she didn't have much Emmy buzz after Shameless debuted in January, but that changed after she gave powerhouse turns in such episodes as 'But at Last Came a Knock'". BuddyTV ranked Shameless #8 on its list of 2011's best new TV shows. Review aggregator Rotten Tomatoes gave the first season a 'fresh' rating of 70% based on 37 reviews, with the critical consensus "Shameless is a dark, urban dramedy that overcomes its leaps of logic thanks to fantastic casting, intriguing ambiance, and shock value." Seasons 2–8 each have an above 90% rating as of 2021, with the exception of season 7, which has an 88% rating. Seasons 9, 10, and 11 have the lowest ratings with 73%, 20%, and 70% respectively as of February 2022.

Ratings
The first episode of the series, "Pilot", was watched by 982,000 viewers, making it the network's biggest turnout for a series premiere since Dead Like Me in 2003. The episode airing January 30, "Casey Casden", received 1.45 million total viewers, making Shameless the best performing first-year drama on Showtime.

Awards and nominations

Home media

In other media
On the November 16, 2018 broadcast of the A&E program Live PD, deputies of the Franklin County Sheriff's Office in Ohio were shown serving an arrest warrant to theft suspect Storm Wisener. When the deputies located her and allowed her to put some clothes on before being transported to jail, a TV in the room they were in could be heard loudly playing a sex scene from the Shameless episode "Church of Gay Jesus," complete with the sounds of Rossum's character, Fiona, moaning in pleasure. Shortly afterward, host Dan Abrams remarked, "So it seems Storm has been captured, but maybe Stormy was in the background there."

References

External links

 
2010s American comedy-drama television series
2020s American comedy-drama television series
2011 American television series debuts
2010s American LGBT-related drama television series
2020s American LGBT-related drama television series
2021 American television series endings
Gay-related television shows
American television series based on British television series
Television series about dysfunctional families

English-language television shows
Showtime (TV network) original programming
Television series by Warner Bros. Television Studios
Television shows set in Chicago
Salary controversies in television
Television shows filmed in Los Angeles
Alcohol abuse in television
2010s American sex comedy television series
2020s American sex comedy television series
Bipolar disorder in fiction
Teenage pregnancy in television
Casual sex in television
Television series about siblings